Siyin may refer to:

 Siyin, Burma, a village, a valley and a Reserve Forest in western Burma
 The Sizang, a Chin people, also known as the Siyin or the Thaute people
 Siyin Island, an island, part of the Dongyin Township, in Lienchiang County (the Matsu Islands), Taiwan (ROC)